Antonis Dermatis (23 September 1936 – 26 May 2018) was a Greek footballer. He played in seven matches for the Greece national football team from 1957 to 1960.

References

External links
 

1936 births
2018 deaths
Greece international footballers
Footballers from Piraeus
Association football forwards
Greek footballers
Apollon Smyrnis F.C. players
Olympiacos F.C. players